Kora (Urdu کوڑہ) is a village and union council of Jhelum District in the Punjab Province of Pakistan. It is part of Pind Dadan Khan Tehsil.

References 

Villages in Union Council Golepur
Populated places in Tehsil Pind Dadan Khan